Sacred Reich is an American thrash metal band based in Phoenix, Arizona, that was formed in 1985. The band split in 2000, but reunited in 2006. Sacred Reich has been credited, along with Testament, Destruction, Death Angel and Dark Angel, for leading the second wave of thrash metal in the late 1980s.

History
After several albums on Metal Blade Records, Sacred Reich signed to Hollywood Records for a short stint, but later returned to Metal Blade to continue their musical career. After breaking up in 2000, the band announced in November 2006 they would play several shows in the summer of 2007 in Europe, including Wacken Open Air.

Throughout its -year career (with the exception of a hiatus from 2000 to 2006), Sacred Reich has performed live globally, including playing at clubs, theaters, arenas and festivals. They have performed alongside numerous acts such as Iron Maiden, Judas Priest, Megadeth, Slayer, Motörhead, Sepultura, Pantera, Exodus, Testament, Anthrax, Flotsam and Jetsam, Dark Angel, Accept, Napalm Death, Obituary, D.R.I, Vio-lence, Forbidden, Holy Moses, Forced Entry, Gwar, Suicidal Tendencies, Iron Reagan, Overkill, Kreator, Destruction, Corrosion of Conformity, Queensrÿche, King Diamond, Municipal Waste, the Cro-Mags, Sick of It All, Excel, Atrophy, Heathen, Armored Saint, Nuclear Assault, the Crumbsuckers, M.O.D., Agnostic Front, Death Angel, Onslaught, Xentrix, Coroner, Danzig, Crowbar, Viking, Evildead, Savatage, Trouble, Cathedral and Omen.

Former drummer Dave McClain went on to join Machine Head in 1995. Lead guitarist Wiley Arnett went on to form The Human Condition with St. Madness vocalist Prophet in July 2000.

The band also contributed the Black Sabbath cover "Sweet Leaf" to the Hempilation: Freedom Is NORML compilation album to benefit NORML, and the Subhumans cover "The Big Picture" appears as the B-side of the "Open Book" promotional single.  A three disk boxed set with remastered versions of Ignorance and Surf Nicaragua with additional bonus material, including the "Draining You of Life" demo tape and a live DVD, was released in Europe only in the summer of 2007 by Metal Blade Records. In the spring of 2017, the band announced their first North American tour in 21 years.

In January 2018, Sacred Reich signed to Metal Blade Records and began working on their fifth studio album, Awakening, which was released on August 23, 2019. It is the band's first full-length studio album since 1996's Heal, and their first since drummer Dave McClain and guitarist Joey Radziwill replaced founding members Greg Hall and Jason Rainey respectively.

Founding member and former guitarist Jason Rainey died on March 16, 2020, at the age of 53 from an apparent heart attack.

As of September 2020, Sacred Reich has been working on their sixth studio album.

Personnel

Current members
 Phil Rind – bass, vocals (1985–2000, 2006–present)
 Wiley Arnett – lead guitar (1986–2000, 2006–present)
 Dave McClain – drums (1991–1995, 2018–present)
 Joey Radziwill – rhythm guitar (2019–present)

Touring musicians
 Chuck FitzGerald – drums (1996)
 Tim Radziwill  – drums (2018)

Former members
 Jason Rainey – rhythm guitar (1985–2000, 2006–2019, died in 2020)
 Greg Hall – drums (1985–1991, 1996–2000, 2006–2018)
 Dan Kelly – vocals (1985–1986)
 Jeff Martinek – lead guitar (1985–1986, died in 2018)
 Ray Nay – drums (1985)
 Mike Andre – bass (1985)

Timeline

Discography
Studio
 Ignorance (1987)
 The American Way (1990)
 Independent (1993)
 Heal (1996)
 Awakening (2019)

EPs
 Draining You of Life (demo) (1986)
 Surf Nicaragua (1988)
 A Question (1991)

Live albums
 Alive at the Dynamo (1989)
 Still Ignorant (1997)

DVDs
 Live at Wacken (2012)

References

External links

 
 

1986 establishments in Arizona
American groove metal musical groups
American thrash metal musical groups
Heavy metal musical groups from Arizona
Musical groups from Phoenix, Arizona
Musical groups established in 1986
Musical groups disestablished in 2000
Musical groups reestablished in 2007
Musical quartets
Political music groups
Metal Blade Records artists